Toti or TOTI may refer to:

 Amanzimtoti, a coastal town in Kwa-Zulu Natal, South Africa
 Twilight of the Innocents, an album by the band Ash
 Toti (footballer) (b. 1987), Spanish footballer, full name Daniel García Pérez
 Tote Gomes (b. 1999), Portuguese footballer, signed to English Premier League club Wolverhampton Wanderers
 Tóti, the Hungarian name for Tăuteu Commune, Bihor County, Romania
 Toți, a river in Ialomița County, Romania
 William Toti, retired naval officer, writer, photographer, business leader